The 2015 French Open described below in detail, in the form of day-by-day summaries.

Day 1 (24 May)
Schedule of play
 Seeds out:
 Men's Singles:  Ivo Karlović [25],  Guillermo García-López [26]
 Women's Singles:  Peng Shuai [24],  Caroline Garcia [31]

Day 2 (25 May)
Schedule of play
 Seeds out:
 Men's Singles:  Feliciano López [11],  Adrian Mannarino [30]
 Women's Singles:  Agnieszka Radwańska [14],  Venus Williams [15],  Barbora Strýcová [22]

Day 3 (26 May)
Schedule of play
 Seeds out:
 Men's Singles:  Grigor Dimitrov [10]
 Women's Singles:  Eugenie Bouchard [6],  Jelena Janković [25]
 Men's Doubles:  Marcel Granollers /  Marc López [4]

Day 4 (27 May)
Schedule of play
 Seeds out:
 Men's Singles:  Roberto Bautista Agut [19],  Ernests Gulbis [24],  Fabio Fognini [28],  Fernando Verdasco [32]
 Women's Singles:  Simona Halep [3]
 Men's Doubles:  Juan Sebastián Cabal /  Robert Farah [16]

Day 5 (28 May)
Schedule of play
 Seeds out:
 Men's Singles:  John Isner [16],  Tommy Robredo [18],  Philipp Kohlschreiber [22],  Bernard Tomic [27],  Viktor Troicki [31]
 Women's Singles:  Caroline Wozniacki [5],  Karolína Plíšková [12],  Svetlana Kuznetsova [18],  Zarina Diyas [32]
 Women's Doubles:  Garbiñe Muguruza /  Carla Suárez Navarro [5],  Raquel Kops-Jones /  Abigail Spears [6],  Klaudia Jans-Ignacik /  Andreja Klepač [16]
 Mixed Doubles:  Sania Mirza /  Bruno Soares [1],  Elena Vesnina /  Nenad Zimonjić [3],  Andrea Hlaváčková /  Marc López [4]

Day 6 (29 May)
Schedule of play
 Seeds out:
 Men's Singles:  Pablo Cuevas [21]
 Women's Singles:  Carla Suárez Navarro [8],  Angelique Kerber [11],  Sabine Lisicki [20],  Samantha Stosur [26]
 Men's Doubles:  Marin Draganja /  Henri Kontinen [13]
 Women's Doubles:  Alla Kudryavtseva /  Anastasia Pavlyuchenkova [10]
 Mixed Doubles:  Caroline Garcia /  Bob Bryan [5]

Day 7 (30 May)
Schedule of play
 Seeds out:
 Men's Singles:  Kevin Anderson [15],  David Goffin [17],  Leonardo Mayer [23],  Nick Kyrgios [29]
 Women's Singles:  Andrea Petkovic [10],  Madison Keys [16],  Victoria Azarenka [27],  Irina-Camelia Begu [30]
 Men's Doubles:  Pablo Cuevas /  David Marrero [12],  Guillermo García-López /  Édouard Roger-Vasselin [15]
 Women's Doubles:  Tímea Babos /  Kristina Mladenovic [3]
 Mixed Doubles:  Martina Hingis /  Leander Paes [8]

Day 8 (31 May)
Schedule of play
 Seeds out:
 Men's Singles:  Tomáš Berdych [4],  Gilles Simon [12]
 Women's Singles:  Ekaterina Makarova [9],  Alizé Cornet [29]
 Men's Doubles:  Rohan Bopanna /  Florin Mergea [9],  Daniel Nestor /  Leander Paes [10],  Jamie Murray /  John Peers [11],  Pierre-Hugues Herbert /  Nicolas Mahut [14]
 Women's Doubles:  Caroline Garcia /  Katarina Srebotnik [8],  Chan Yung-jan /  Zheng Jie [11],  Karin Knapp /  Roberta Vinci [14] 	 	
 Mixed Doubles:  Kristina Mladenovic /  Daniel Nestor [6]

Day 9 (1 June)
Schedule of play
 Seeds out:
 Men's Singles:  Marin Čilić [9],  Gaël Monfils [13],  Richard Gasquet [20]
 Women's Singles:  Maria Sharapova [2],  Petra Kvitová [4],  Flavia Pennetta [28]
 Men's Doubles:  Alexander Peya /  Bruno Soares [8]
 Women's Doubles:  Anastasia Rodionova /  Arina Rodionova [15]

Day 10 (2 June)
Schedule of play
 Seeds out:
 Men's Singles:  Roger Federer [2],  Kei Nishikori [5]
 Women's Singles:  Elina Svitolina [19],  Garbiñe Muguruza [21]
 Men's Doubles:  Vasek Pospisil /  Jack Sock [2],  Marcin Matkowski /  Nenad Zimonjić [7]
 Women's Doubles:  Michaëlla Krajicek /  Barbora Strýcová [13]
 Mixed Doubles:  Tímea Babos /  Alexander Peya [7]

Day 11 (3 June)
Schedule of play
 Seeds out:
 Men's Singles:  Rafael Nadal [6],  David Ferrer [7]
 Women's Singles:  Sara Errani [17]
 Women's Doubles:  Martina Hingis /  Sania Mirza [1],  Hsieh Su-wei /  Flavia Pennetta [4]

Day 12 (4 June)
Schedule of play
 Seeds out:
 Women's Singles:  Ana Ivanovic [7],  Timea Bacsinszky [23]
 Men's Doubles:  Jean-Julien Rojer /  Horia Tecău [5],  Simone Bolelli /  Fabio Fognini [6]

Day 13 (5 June)
Schedule of play
 Seeds out:
 Men's Singles:  Jo-Wilfried Tsonga [14]
 Women's Doubles:  Ekaterina Makarova /  Elena Vesnina [2],  Andrea Hlaváčková /  Lucie Hradecká [9]

Day 14 (6 June)
Schedule of play
 Seeds out:
 Men's Singles:  Andy Murray [3]
 Women's Singles:  Lucie Šafářová [13]
 Men's Doubles:  Bob Bryan /  Mike Bryan [1]

Day 15 (7 June)
Schedule of play
 Seeds out:
 Men's Singles:  Novak Djokovic [1]
 Women's Doubles:  Casey Dellacqua /  Yaroslava Shvedova [12]

Day-by-day summaries
French Open by year – Day-by-day summaries